Ibn Nafis Hospital is one of the major hospitals of Marrakesh, Morocco. In February 2001 the Moroccan Government signed an $8 million loan agreement with The OPEC Fund for International Development to help improve medical services in and around Marrakech, which led to expansions of Ibn Nafess Hospital  and Ibn Tofail University Hospital.

References

Hospitals in Marrakesh
Hospitals in Morocco